The Slovak National Party (SNS) is a nationalist political party in Slovakia. The party characterizes itself as a nationalist party based on both social and the European Christian values.

Since 1990 SNS has won seats in every Slovak parliament but three (in 2002, 2012 and 2020) and has been part of the government from 2006 to 2010. In that year it formed a coalition with Robert Fico's Direction – Social Democracy (Smer-SD), which resulted in suspension of Smer-SD from the Party of European Socialists (PES). The PES considered SNS a "political party which incites or attempts to stir up racial or ethnic prejudices and racial hatred." However, in 2008 Smer's membership suspension ended with no further PES's demands regarding SNS. In the 2012 parliamentary election, SNS failed to meet the 5% electoral threshold and thus lost parliamentary representation. At the following party congress in October 2012, the delegates chose lawyer Andrej Danko as the new chairman of the party.

History
The party was founded in December 1989 and perceives itself as an ideological heir to the historical Slovak National Party. The party declares its three pillars: Christian, national and social. One of the biggest events the SNS has participated in since then was the establishment of an independent Slovakia on 1 January 1993. The SNS has had deputies in the Slovak parliament in the years 1990–2002 and 2006–2012. The party also had deputies in the Slovak government. Marián Andel, Jozef Prokeš, Jaroslav Paška and Ľudovít Černák were in the second Mečiar government (1992–1994), Ján Sitek and Eva Slavkovská in the third Mečiar government (1994–1998) and other deputies were in the government of Robert Fico from 2006–2010 (see below).

Between 2001 and 2005 there was a Real Slovak National Party (Pravá slovenská národná strana, PSNS), a party of SNS splinters, which remerged with SNS later. Since 2005, there is also a United Slovak National Party (Zjednotená slovenská národná strana, ZSNS), also formed of former SNS members. In February 2006, PSNS changed its name into the Slovak National Coalition – Slovak Mutuality (Slovenská národná koalícia – Slovenská vzájomnosť). However, only the Slovak National Party is currently relevant.

In 2008 a €120 million tender for establishing the rules and guidelines and logos for distribution of funds from the European Union, was won by a consortium of firms with close ties to SNS leader Ján Slota. The tender notice had been posted for only five days on a bulletin board in the ministry run by the SNS party behind a locked door, which resulted in a single bid. Following the scandal, the SNS minister in charge of the contract was fired, and the European Commission has launched an investigation. In 2009 SNS proposed a law to create barriers for women seeking abortion in Slovakia.

Election results

National Council

Presidential

European Parliament

2006–2010: In Slovak government
SNS entered the current Slovak government after Chairman Ján Slota and Robert Fico agreed to create a coalition government. This created an unusual situation of an alleged far-right party, SNS being accepted and taken as a partner by SMER, a party describing itself as leftist. Three SNS ministers were sworn in on 4 July 2006:

Jaroslav Izák as the minister of the environment. Jaroslav Izák was fired from the Environment Ministry top job in the wake of accusations of cronyism, He was succeeded by Ján Chrbet.
Ján Mikolaj as deputy prime minister; minister of education.
Marián Janušek as the minister of construction and regional development. Janušek was sacked from the Ministry's top job for "granting lucrative contracts worth €98 million to two firms, Avocat and Zamedia, which are believed to have links to SNS chairman Ján Slota."

Further ministers, delegated by SNS:
Ján Chrbet as Minister of Environment, after Izák. His firing was over his responsibility in a mega-scandal involving the sale of the country's excess emission quotas at an extremely low price, below their market value.
Viliam Turský as Minister of Environment following Chrbet. Also fired by Fico over a dubious contract he signed with a company. After three SNS Ministers were fired from the same ministry, Fico took away control of the ministry from SNS.

2016 election 
In the 2016 Slovak parliamentary election, the Slovak National Party won 8.64% of the vote, and joined Fico's Third Cabinet on 22 March.

Controversy
In April 2008, a map was published on the official web page discussion forum of the party where the territory of Hungary was divided between Slovakia and Austria, eliminating Hungary from the map. After receiving media attention the map was promptly removed and the party has denied responsibility, referring to the free access policy of the forum section, where the map was posted. The former party leader Ján Slota is the source of considerable controversy, Slota is frequently criticized for arrogance, nationalism, and extremism. The Slovak Spectator reports that most of the media attention Slota receives is because of statements that cross "the line not just of political but also human decency." Documents about party leader Slota's criminal past, detailing arson, grand theft auto and assault, were broadcast by Markíza, the leading private television station in Slovakia, which resulted in a court case Markíza v Slota. During the court proceedings Slota admitted to some of the crimes and even said he was proud of assaulting and beating a Hungarian saying "I am proud of giving that Hungarian a black eye". Another physical assault was committed by Anna Belousovová of SNS against fellow parliamentarian Igor Matovič of SaS. The SNS politician slapped Matovič saying she disliked an article written by him.

Allegations of racism and discrimination
The party under the leadership of Ján Slota had been sometimes described as ultra-nationalist, right-wing extremist, and far-right, due to its statements about Hungarians and Romani which have been characterised as racist. The alleged party's major concern after the dissolution of Czechoslovakia has been the danger of "irredentism". Any moves and changes toward broader rights for the national minorities living in Slovakia, especially the sizeable Hungarian minority living in southern Slovakia, was seen as a step toward territorial autonomy.

The party had been known for its inflammatory rhetoric against ethnic Roma and Hungarians. The Party of European Socialists, considered SNS as a "political party which incites or attempts to stir up racial or ethnic prejudices and racial hatred." The former party's leader Ján Slota, referred to by Earthtimes as "a xenophobic politician who has stirred anti-Hungarian sentiments", said the best policy for dealing with the Romani was "a long whip in a small yard." He is quoted as saying "we will sit in our tanks and destroy Budapest" and questioning if homosexuals are normal people. Slota stated that "The Hungarians are a cancer in the body of the Slovak nation." Slota called the fascist leader Jozef Tiso "one of the greatest sons of the Slovak nation" and on 17 February 2000, 40 of the 41 city council members in Žilina, where Slota was mayor at the time, voted to dedicate a plaque honouring Jozef Tiso, who was convicted and executed for the breaking Czechoslovak state and for collaboration with Nazi Germany. Later in a move that was described as absurd by a Slovak journalist, SNS demanded the seat of deputy prime minister responsible for human rights and national minorities. The party did not manage to obtain the seat.

Allegations of fascism
In the past, the SNS party was accused of being a fascist party. The allegations are sometimes connected to various statements of party members or that SNS was behind "the continuing campaign to rehabilitate Jozef Tiso, head of the wartime fascist regime, which was responsible for the deportation of the country's Jews to the death camps" might also be a contributing factor. One high-profile fascist allegation was when in 2006 in a live interview with Inforadio, a politician of the Party of the Hungarian Coalition, Miklós Duray described SNS as a "fascist party". Duray said "one third of the Slovak government is made up of Slota's party which is fascist" describing the 2006 governing coalition between Robert Fico's Smer, Ján Slota's SNS, and HZDS, making SNS one of the three governing parties. SNS sued for financial damages, alleging the statement caused it loss of votes, image, and reputation. The District Court ruled that Duray was to pay one million crowns as a compensation and to apologize for his statements. The Slovak Supreme Court ultimately decided that SNS is not entitled for the financial compensation, because the party did not sufficiently document the alleged damage. SNS party chairman Ján Slota denounced the Supreme Court of Slovakia for that decision.

Leadership 
Leaders of the Slovak National Party:
 Víťazoslav Móric 1990 – 1991
 Jozef Prokeš 1991 – 1992
 Ľudovít Černák 1992 – 1994
 Ján Slota 1994 – 1999
 Anna Malíková 1999 – 2003
 Ján Slota 2003 – 2012
 Andrej Danko 2012–present

References

External links
Official website of the Slovak National Party

Euronat members
Conservative parties in Slovakia
Nationalist parties in Slovakia
Far-right political parties in Slovakia
Political parties established in 1989
Anti-Hungarian sentiment in Slovakia
Antiziganism in Slovakia
Eurosceptic parties in Slovakia
Slovak nationalism
National conservative parties
Social conservative parties
Right-wing populist parties
Right-wing populism in Slovakia
Political parties with anti-Hungarian sentiment
Right-wing politics in Slovakia
Right-wing parties in Europe